Yugoslavs or Yugoslavians (Bosnian and ; Macedonian, Montenegrin and) is an identity that was originally designed to refer to a united South Slavic people. It has been used in two connotations: the first in a sense of common shared ethnic descent, i.e. panethnic or supraethnic connotation for ethnic South Slavs, and the second as a term for all citizens of former Yugoslavia regardless of ethnicity. Cultural and political advocates of Yugoslav identity have historically ascribed the identity to be applicable to all people of South Slav heritage, including those of modern Bosnia and Herzegovina, Croatia, Montenegro, North Macedonia, Serbia, and Slovenia. Although Bulgarians are a South Slavic group, attempts at uniting Bulgaria into Yugoslavia were unsuccessful, and therefore Bulgarians were not included in the panethnic identification. Since the dissolution of Yugoslavia and the establishment of South Slavic nation states, the term ethnic Yugoslavs has been used to refer to those who exclusively view themselves as Yugoslavs with no other ethnic self-identification, many of these being of mixed ancestry.

In the former Yugoslavia, the official designation for those who declared themselves simply as Yugoslav was with quotation marks, "Yugoslavs" (introduced in census 1971). The quotation marks were originally meant to distinguish Yugoslav ethnicity from Yugoslav citizenship, which was written without quotation marks. The majority of those who had once identified as ethnic "Yugoslavs" reverted to or adopted traditional ethnic and national identities. Some also decided to turn to sub-national regional identifications, especially in multi-ethnic historical regions like Istria, Vojvodina, or Bosnia (hence Bosnians). The Yugoslav designation, however, continues to be used by many, especially in the United States, Canada, and Australia by the descendants of Yugoslav migrants who left while the country still existed.

History

Yugoslavism and Yugoslavia

Since the late 18th century, when traditional European ethnic affiliations started to mature into modern ethnic identities, there have been numerous attempts to define a common South Slavic ethnic identity. The word Yugoslav, meaning "South Slavic", was first used by Josip Juraj Strossmayer in 1849. The first modern iteration of Yugoslavism was the Illyrian movement in Habsburg Croatia. It identified South Slavs with ancient Illyrians and sought to construct a common language based on the Shtokavian dialect. The movement was led by Ljudevit Gaj, whose script became one of two official scripts used for the Serbo-Croatian language.

Among notable supporters of Yugoslavism and a Yugoslav identity active at the beginning of the 20th century were famous sculptor Ivan Meštrović (1883–1962), who called Serbian folk hero Prince Marko "our Yugoslav people with its gigantic and noble heart" and wrote poetry speaking of a "Yugoslav race"; Jovan Cvijić, in his article The Bases of Yugoslav Civilization, developed the idea of a unified Yugoslav culture and stated that "New qualities that until now have been expressed but weakly will appear. An amalgamation of the most fertile qualities of our three tribes [Serbs, Croats, Slovenes] will come forth every more strongly, and thus will be constructed the type of single Yugoslav civilization-the final and most important goal of our country." In late 19th and early 20th century, influential public intellectuals Jovan Cvijić and Vladimir Dvorniković advocated that Yugoslavs, as a supra-ethnic nation, had "many tribal ethnicities, such as Croats, Serbs, and others within it."

On 28 June 1914, Gavrilo Princip shot and killed Archduke Franz Ferdinand, the heir to the Austrian throne, and his wife, in Sarajevo. Princip was a member of Young Bosnia, a group whose aims included the unification of the Yugoslavs and independence from Austria-Hungary. The assassination in Sarajevo set into motion a series of fast-moving events that eventually escalated into full-scale war. After his capture, during his trial, he stated "I am a Yugoslav nationalist, aiming for the unification of all Yugoslavs, and I do not care what form of state, but it must be free from Austria."

In June–July 1917, the Yugoslav Committee met with the Serbian Government in Corfu and on 20 July the Corfu Declaration that laid the foundation for the post-war state was issued. The preamble stated that the Serbs, Croats and Slovenes were "the same by blood, by language, by the feelings of their unity, by the continuity and integrity of the territory which they inhabit undivided, and by the common vital interests of their national survival and manifold development of their moral and material life." The state was created as the Kingdom of Serbs, Croats and Slovenes, a constitutional monarchy under the Karađorđević dynasty. The term "Yugoslavs" was used to refer to all of its inhabitants, but particularly to those of South Slavic ethnicity. Some Croatian nationalists viewed the Serb plurality and Serbian royal family as hegemonic. Eventually, a conflict of interest sparked among the Yugoslav peoples. In 1929, King Alexander sought to resolve a deep political crisis brought on by ethnic tensions by assuming dictatorial powers in the 6 January Dictatorship, renaming the country "Kingdom of Yugoslavia", and officially pronouncing that there is one single Yugoslav nation with three tribes. The Yugoslav ethnic designation was thus imposed for a period of time on all South Slavs in Yugoslavia. Changes in Yugoslav politics after King Alexander's death in 1934 brought an end to this policy, but the designation continued to be used by some people.

Philosopher Vladimir Dvorniković advocated the establishment of a Yugoslav ethnicity in his 1939 book entitled "The Characterology of the Yugoslavs". His views included eugenics and cultural blending to create one, strong Yugoslav nation.

There had on three occasions been efforts to make Bulgaria a part of Yugoslavia or part of an even larger federation: through Aleksandar Stamboliyski during and after World War I; through Zveno during the Bulgarian coup d'état of 1934, and through Georgi Dimitrov during and after World War II, but for various reasons, each attempt turned out to be unsuccessful.

Self-identification in Second Yugoslavia

Unitary policies implemented by the authorities of the early 20th century Kingdom of Yugoslavia aimed at creating a single Yugoslav ethnic identity that speaks one South Slavic language were met with heavy resistance by majorities of the country's citizens. Those policies and attempts at concentration of power within the ruling Serbian royal dynasty, the Karađorđevićs, were interpreted by opponents of Yugoslav unitarism and Serbian nationalism as gradual Serbianization of Yugoslavia's non-Serb population. The Communist Party of Yugoslavia was ideologically opposed to ethnic unitarism and royal hegemony, promoting ethnic diversity and social Yugoslavism within the notion of "brotherhood and unity". After the country's liberation from Axis Powers in 1945 by the Yugoslav Partisans, the new socialist Yugoslavia was instead organized as a federation; it officially recognized and acknowledged its ethnic diversity. Traditional ethnic identities again became the primary ethnic designations used by most inhabitants of Yugoslavia which remained the case until the country's dissolution in the early 1990s. However, many people still declared themselves as "Yugoslavs" because they wanted to express an identification with Yugoslavia as a whole, but not specifically with any of its peoples.

Josip Broz Tito expressed his desire for an undivided Yugoslav ethnicity to develop naturally when he stated, "I would like to live to see the day when Yugoslavia would become amalgamated into a firm community, when she would no longer be a formal community but a community of a single Yugoslav nation."

Yugoslav censuses reflected Tito's ideal, with "Yugoslav" being an available identification for both ethnicity and nationality. In general, the Yugoslav identity was more common in the multiethnic regions of the country, i.e. the more multiethnic the constituent republic, the higher the percentage; therefore the highest were in Croatia, Montenegro, Central Serbia, Vojvodina, and Bosnia and Herzegovina, while the lowest were in Slovenia, Macedonia, and Kosovo. The 1971 census recorded 273,077 Yugoslavs, or 1.33% of the total population. The 1981 census, a year after the death of Tito, recorded a record number of 1,216,463 or 5.4% Yugoslavs.

In the 1991 census, 5.54% (242,682) of the inhabitants of Bosnia and Herzegovina declared themselves to be Yugoslav. The Constitution of the Republic of Bosnia and Herzegovina from 1990 ratified a Presidency of seven members. One of the seven was to be elected amongst/by the republic's Yugoslavs, thereby introducing the Yugoslavs next to ethnic Muslims, Serbs and Croats into the Constitutional framework of Bosnia and Herzegovina although on an inferior level. However, because of the Bosnian War that erupted in 1992, this Constitution was short-lived and unrealized.
Approximately 5% of the population of Montenegro also declared themselves Yugoslav in the same census.
The 1981 census showed that Yugoslavs made up around 8.2% of the population in Croatia, this being the highest ever percentage of Yugoslavs within a constituent republic's borders. The percentage was the highest in multiethnic regions and cities with large non-Croatian population and among those of mixed ancestry. The 1991 census data indicated that the number of Yugoslavs had dropped to 2% of the population in Croatia. The 2001 census in Croatia (the first since independence) registered 176 Yugoslavs, less than 0.001% of the population at the time. The next census in 2011 registered 331 Yugoslavs in Croatia (>0.01% of the population).
The autonomous region of Vojvodina, marked by its traditionally multiethnic make-up, recorded a similar percentage as Croatia at the 1981 census, with ~8% of its 2 million inhabitants declaring themselves Yugoslav.

Just before and after the dissolution of Yugoslavia, most Yugoslavs reverted to their ethnic and regional identities. Nevertheless, the concept has survived in parts of Bosnia and Herzegovina (where most towns have a tiny percentage), and Serbia and Montenegro (2003–2006), which kept the name "Yugoslavia" the longest, right up to February 2003.

Successor states

Self-identification

The number of people identifying as Yugoslav fell drastically in all successor states since the beginning of the 21st century and the conclusion of all Yugoslav Wars and separation of Serbia and Montenegro (until 2003 called FR Yugoslavia). The country with the highest number of people and percentage of population identifying as Yugoslav is Serbia, while North Macedonia is the lowest on both. No official figures or reliable estimates are available for Kosovo.

Organizations

The Yugoslavs of Croatia have several organizations. The "Alliance of Yugoslavs" (Savez Jugoslavena), established in 2010 in Zagreb, is an association aiming to unite the Yugoslavs of Croatia, regardless of religion, sex, political or other views. Its main goal is the official recognition of the Yugoslav nation in every Yugoslav successor state: Croatia, Slovenia, Serbia, North Macedonia, Bosnia and Herzegovina and Montenegro.

Another pro-Yugoslav organization advocating the recognition of the Yugoslav nation is the "Our Yugoslavia" association (Udruženje "Naša Jugoslavija"), which is an officially registered organization in Croatia. The seat of Our Yugoslavia is in the Istrian town of Pula, where it was founded on 30 July 2009. The association has most members in the towns of Rijeka, Zagreb and Pula. Its main aim is the stabilisation of relations among the Yugoslav successor states. It is also active in Bosnia and Herzegovina, however, its official registration as an association was denied by the Bosnian state authorities.

The probably best-known pro-Yugoslav organization in Montenegro is the "Consulate-general of the SFRY" with its headquarters in the coastal town of Tivat. Prior to the population census of 2011, Marko Perković, the president of this organization called on the Yugoslavs of Montenegro to freely declare their Yugoslav identity on the upcoming census.

Notable people
The best known example of self-declared Yugoslavs is Marshal Josip Broz Tito who organized resistance against Nazi Germany in Yugoslavia, ended the Axis occupation of Yugoslavia with the help of the Red Army, co-founded the Non-Aligned Movement, and defied Joseph Stalin's Soviet pressure on Yugoslavia. Other people that declared as "Yugoslavs" include intellectuals, entertainers, singers, and athletes, such as:

 Ivo Andrić
 Goran Bregović
 Lepa Brena
 Joška Broz, the grandson of Josip Broz Tito
 Oliver Dulić
 Srđan Dragojević
 Đorđe Đogani
 Branko Đurić 
 Ivan Ergić
 Andrej Grubačić
 Ekrem Jevrić
 Edvin Kanka Ćudić
 Božo Koprivica
 Magnifico
 Igor Mandić
 Branko Milićević "Kockica"
 Milan Milišić
 Ašok Murti
 Ivica Osim
 Srđa Popović
 Dževad Prekazi
 Miljenko Smoje
 Branimir Štulić
 Bogdan Tanjević
 Dubravka Ugrešić
 Jovan Vavic
 Duško Vujošević
 Milić Vukašinović

Symbols

The probably most frequently used symbol of the Yugoslavs to express their identity and to which they are most often associated with is the blue-white-red tricolor flag with a yellow-bordered red star in the flag's center, which also served as the national flag of the Socialist Federal Republic of Yugoslavia between 1945 and 1991.

Prior to World War II, the symbol of Yugoslavism was a plain tricolor flag of blue, white, and red, which was also the national flag of the Kingdom of Yugoslavia, the Yugoslav state in the interwar period.

Historiography

See also
 Yugoslavism
 Czechoslovaks
 Pan-Slavism
 Pan-nationalism
 Meta-ethnicity
 Ethnogenesis
 Multiculturalism
 Demographics of Yugoslavia
 Yugo-nostalgia
 Titoism

Notes

References

Sources

Further reading

External links

 Yugoslav club in Serbia
 Yugoslav Alliance in Croatia [sh]

 

South Slavs
Slavic ethnic groups
Ethnic groups in the Balkans
Ethnic groups in Serbia
Ethnic groups in Vojvodina
Ethnic groups in Bosnia and Herzegovina
Ethnic groups in Slovenia